The Chaplet of the Divine Mercy, also called the Divine Mercy Chaplet, is a Christian devotion to the Divine Mercy, based on the Christological apparitions of Jesus reported by Faustina Kowalska (1905–1938), known as "the Apostle of Mercy". She was a Polish religious sister of the Congregation of the Sisters of Our Lady of Mercy and canonized as a Catholic saint in 2000.

Kowalska stated that she received the prayer through visions and conversations with Jesus, who made specific promises regarding the recitation of the prayers. Her Vatican biography quotes some of these conversations.
 
As a Roman Catholic devotion, the chaplet is often said as a rosary-based prayer with the same set of rosary beads used for reciting the Rosary or the Chaplet of Holy Wounds. As an Anglican devotion, the Divine Mercy Society of the Anglican Church states that the chaplet can also be recited on Anglican prayer beads. The chaplet may also be said without beads, usually by counting prayers on the fingertips, and may be accompanied by the veneration of the Divine Mercy image.<ref>Sourcebook for Sundays and Seasons 2008 by D. Todd Williamson 2007  page 195</ref>

History

On September 13, 1935, while Kowalska was in Vilnius, she wrote of a vision of Jesus about the chaplet in her diary (Notebook 1 item 476).A Divine Mercy Resource by Richard Torretto 2010  pages 63-79 Kowalska stated that Jesus asked her to pray the chaplet and instruct others to do so. Although the chaplet is said on beads like the Rosary, it is about a third of the length of the Rosary, and unlike the Rosary that has evolved over the years, the form and structure of the chaplet has remained unchanged since Kowalska attributed it to a message from Jesus.Catholic Chaplaincy :The Promises of Jesus to Those Who Pray The Chaplet

According to Kowalska's visions, written in her diary, the chaplet's prayers for mercy are threefold: to obtain mercy, to trust in Christ's mercy, and to show mercy to others.Catherine M. Odell, 1998, Faustina: Apostle of Divine Mercy OSV Press  Kowalska wrote that Jesus promised that all who recite this chaplet at the hour of death or in the presence of the dying will receive great mercy. She wrote that Jesus said:"....When they say this Chaplet in the presence of the dying, I will stand between My Father and the dying not as the just judge but as the Merciful Savior." 
Kowalska stated that Jesus also promised that anything can be obtained with this prayer if it is compatible with his will. In her diary Kowalska recounted a vision on September 13, 1935 in which she saw an angel sent to a city to destroy it. Kowalska began to pray for God's mercy on the city and felt the strong presence of the Holy Trinity.  After she prayed the internally instructed prayers, the angel was powerless to harm the city. In subsequent visions, Kowalska learned that the prayers she spoke were to be taught to all the people of the world.

Pope John Paul II was instrumental in the formal establishment of the Divine Mercy devotion and acknowledged the efforts of the Marian Fathers in its promotion in a Papal Blessing in 2001, the 70th anniversary of the revelation of the Divine Mercy Message and Devotion. Although the prayers said on the beads of the rosary chain share specific similarities between the Chaplet of Divine Mercy and the Chaplet of Holy Wounds, these are distinct chaplets and were introduced over 20 years apart, one in Poland, the other in France.

 Practice 
According to Roman Catholic tradition, the chaplet may be said at any time, but it is said especially on Divine Mercy Sunday and Fridays at 3:00 PM. The chaplet is prayed daily at the National Shrine of The Divine Mercy in Stockbridge, Massachusetts and on the National Shrine in Krakow and Vilinus respectively at the shared time. 

In Poland, the traditional phase of praying the chaplet originally recite and begins with Our Father, Hail Mary and Apostle's Creed and follows with Eternal Fatherat the opening of each 5 decade large beads, then it follows with For the sake of his sorrowful passion at the 10 small beads each of the 5 large beads afterwards, at the end of each chaplet a portional phrase with Holy God.. must said or sung after the praying of the decade. At the end of the chaplet, the prayers which saids Oh Blood and Water will says 3 times then follows with Jesus, I Trust In You 3 times also and Saint Faustina, Apostle of Mercy, Save Us once. On the American model of the chaplet, it may begin with You Expired Jesus as the opening prayer followed by Our Father, Hail Mary and Credo afterwards, then it recite the large beads and the small beads each as per Polish model, after the completion praying of the 5 decade each, it concludes with Holy God three times and followed by the closing prayer.

In the Philippines, the opening portion of the chaplet known as the "3 O'Clock Habit" (Filipino: Panalangin Para Sa Ika-tatlo Ng Hapon) is broadcast on radio stations and television networks (some radio and television stations (with the exception of ABS-CBN television network and ABS-CBN's DZMM radio station) dropped the practice in 1990s and 2000s but it is currently only shown on ABS-CBN's Kapamilya Channel and TeleRadyo) daily since June 16, 1985 at 3:00 in the Afternoon. In 2000, Pope John Paul II ordained the Sunday after Easter as the Divine Mercy Sunday, where Roman Catholics remember the institution of the Sacrament of Penance. The hour Jesus died by crucifixion, 3:00 PM (15:00), is called the Hour of Mercy. In a novena, the chaplet is usually said each of the nine days from Good Friday to Divine Mercy Sunday.

Chaplet
Prayers
The chaplet contains several unique prayers. The rosary may be used to move through the prayers.

First opening prayer
This prayer is prayed on the first large bead where the Our Father is normally prayed and may be used to begin the chaplet:You expired, Jesus, but the source of life gushed forth for souls, and the ocean of mercy opened up for the whole world. O Fount of Life, unfathomable Divine Mercy, envelop the whole world and empty Yourself out upon us.

Second opening prayer
This prayer, repeated three times in succession, is prayed still on the first large bead and may be used along with the first opening prayer to begin the chaplet:O Blood and Water, which gushed forth from the Heart of Jesus as a fountain of Mercy for us, I trust in You!

Eternal Father
This prayer opens each decade of the chaplet and is prayed on the single beads separating the decades where the Our Father is normally prayed:Eternal Father, I offer you the Body and Blood, Soul and Divinity of Your Dearly Beloved Son, Our Lord, Jesus Christ, in atonement for our sins and those of the whole world.

For the sake of His sorrowful Passion
This prayer, repeated 10 times in succession, forms the body of each decade of the chaplet, using the beads where the Hail Marys are normally recited:For the sake of His sorrowful Passion, have mercy on us and on the whole world.

Holy God
This prayer, repeated three times in succession, concludes the chaplet, recited where the Hail Holy Queen is normally prayed:Holy God, Holy Mighty One, Holy Immortal One, have mercy on us and on the whole world.

Closing prayer
This prayer is used after the Holy God to end the chaplet:Eternal God, in whom mercy is endless and the treasury of compassion — inexhaustible, look kindly upon us and increase Your mercy in us, that in difficult moments we might not despair nor become despondent, but with great confidence submit ourselves to Your holy will, which is Love and Mercy itself.St. Faustina Kowalska Diary - Divine Mercy in My Soul - 950

Structure

The chaplet is prayed on ordinary rosary beads that are also used to pray the Dominican Rosary. The structure of the chaplet is as follows:

The chaplet is begun on the short strand of the rosary beads: 
 The sign of the cross on the Crucifix; 
 The optional first opening prayer on the first large bead;
 The optional second opening prayer, repeated three times, still on the first large bead;
 The Lord's Prayer on the first small bead;
 The Hail Mary on the second small bead; and
 The Apostles' Creed on the third small bead.

The praying of the decades then follows, repeating this cycle for each:
 The Eternal Father on the large bead, with a specific offering each decade; and
 The For the sake of His sorrowful Passion on each of the ten adjacent small beads, with other petitions for mercy, emphasizing the offering of the Body and Blood of Christ.

To conclude:
 The Holy God on the medallion;
 The optional closing prayer, still on the medallion;
 Any further intentions; and
 The sign of the cross.

Novena
The chaplet may be repeated over a period of nine days as part of a novena. According to Kowalska's Diary, Jesus himself in a vision asked that the Divine Mercy Novena be prayed as a preparation for the Feast of the Divine Mercy, celebrated each year on first Sunday after Easter. The novena should begin on Good Friday. There is a prayer intention for specific group of people on each of the nine days. The novena intentions for each day are:
 All mankind, in particular, all sinners.
 The souls of Catholic priests and religious.
 All devout and faithful souls.
 Those who do not believe in God and those who do not yet know Him.
 The souls of those separated from the Catholic Church.
 Meek and humble of heart, and children.
 People who especially venerate and glorify Christ's mercy.
 The souls in Purgatory.
 The souls of those who have become lukewarm.

See also

 Divine Mercy Sanctuary (Vilnius)
 Divine Mercy Sanctuary (Kraków)
 Divine Mercy Sanctuary (Płock)
 Works of mercy

References

Further reading
 Diary: Divine Mercy in My Soul by Faustina Kowalska 2003  
 Pope Benedict's Divine Mercy Mandate'' by David Came 2009

External links
The Holy See: "Indulgences attached to devotions in honour of Divine Mercy" (a decree of the Roman Curia; archive at Internet Archive)
United States Conference of Catholic Bishops: How To Pray the Chaplet of Divine Mercy
Marian Fathers of the Immaculate Conception of the B.V.M.: The Divine Mercy: Chaplet of The Divine Mercy
EWTN: The Chaplet of The Divine Mercy
EWTN: Multimedia (for the Chaplet)
Catholic Online: The Chaplet of Divine Mercy
Mark Hargrave: The Chaplet of Divine Mercy
unidentified person: Chaplet of Divine Mercy
Mark Alder: Divine Mercy Section

Catholic spirituality
Divine Mercy
Catholic devotions
Visions of Jesus and Mary